A gambit is a type of chess opening move in which one of the pieces is sacrificed in order to achieve a better position. 

Gambit may also refer to:

Arts and entertainment

Film
 Gambit (1966 film), a 1966 film starring Michael Caine and Shirley MacLaine
 Gambit (2012 film), a remake of the 1966 film
 Gambit (unproduced film), an unproduced X-Men franchise film about the eponymous Marvel Comics comicbook superhero

Television
 Gambit (game show), based on the card game blackjack
 Gambit (British game show), UK version based on the card game blackjack
 Mike Gambit, a character in The New Avengers TV series
 "Gambit", an episode of Blake's 7
 "Gambit" (Star Trek: The Next Generation), a 1993 two-part, seventh-season episode of Star Trek: The Next Generation
 Opening gambit, a short stand-alone action sequence starting many episodes of MacGyver

Music
 The Gambit (born 1982), rapper and record producer
 The Gambit (album) by Shelly Manne & His Men

Other
 Gambit (comics), a fictional comic book superhero and member of the X-Men in the Marvel Universe
 Gambit (novel), a 1962 Nero Wolfe detective novel by Rex Stout
 Gambit system, a party control system implemented in the Final Fantasy XII and Final Fantasy XII: Revenant Wings video game

Technology

 Gambit (forum), a non-profit gambling industry organisation
 Gambit (Scheme implementation), an implementation of the Scheme programming language
 KH-7 Gambit, a reconnaissance satellite used by the United States from July 1963 to June 1967
 KH-8 Gambit 3, a long-lived series of reconnaissance satellites used by the United States from July 1966 to April 1984

Other
 Gambit, a lexical item, or unit
 Gambit Publications, a publisher of chess books
 Gambit (roller coaster), a former roller coaster at Japanese amusement park, Thrill Valley
 Gambit (newspaper), a New Orleans-based newspaper
 Operation Gambit, a part of Operation Neptune
 Contract bridge, opening bid on the 2 level for a long weak suit to be made Trump, thereby hindering opponent bids to reach game in another suit